Current Opinion in Behavioral Sciences is a bimonthly peer-reviewed academic journal covering all aspects of the behavioral sciences. It was established in 2015 and is published by Elsevier as part of their Current Opinion series of journals. The editors-in-chief are Cindy Lustig (University of Michigan) and Trevor Robbins (University of Cambridge). Each issue covers a specific theme and is edited by one or more guest editors.

Abstracting and indexing
The journal is abstracted and indexed in Current Contents/Life Sciences, Current Contents/Social & Behavioral Sciences, Embase, PsycINFO, Science Citation Index Expanded, Scopus, and the Social Sciences Citation Index. According to the Journal Citation Reports, the journal has a 2020 impact factor of 4.466.

References

External links

English-language journals
Elsevier academic journals
Psychology journals
Publications established in 2015
Bimonthly journals